is a Japanese light novel series written by Honobonoru500 and illustrated by Nama. It began serialization as a web novel on the user-generated novel publishing website Shōsetsuka ni Narō in August 2018. It was later acquired by TO Books, who began publishing a light novel in November 2019. It has been collected in eight volumes as of November 2022. A manga adaptation illustrated by Tou Fukino began serialization in TO Books' Comic Corona website in February 2020. The manga has been collected in four volumes as of November 2022. Both the light novel and manga are licensed in North America by Seven Seas Entertainment. An anime television series adaptation has been announced.

Characters

Media

Light novels
Written by Honobonoru500, the series began serialization on the user-generated novel publishing website Shōsetsuka ni Narō on August 9, 2018. It was later acquired by TO Books who began publishing it as a light novel with illustrations by Nama under their TO Bunko light novel imprint on November 9, 2019. The light novel is licensed in North America by Seven Seas Entertainment.

Manga
A manga adaptation illustrated by Tou Fukino began serialization in TO Books' Comic Corona website on February 10, 2020. It has been collected in four tankōbon volumes as of November 2022. The manga is also licensed in North America by Seven Seas Entertainment.

Anime
An anime television series adaptation was announced on November 11, 2022.

References

External links
 
 
 
 

2019 Japanese novels
Anime and manga based on light novels
Fantasy anime and manga
Fiction about reincarnation
Isekai anime and manga
Isekai novels and light novels
Japanese fantasy novels
Light novels
Light novels first published online
Seven Seas Entertainment titles
Shōjo manga
Shōsetsuka ni Narō
Upcoming anime television series